The Menehune Fishpond, near Līhuʻe, Hawai`i, on the island of Kaua`i, is a historic Hawaiian fishpond.  Also known as Alakoko Fishpond, it has been listed on the U.S. National Register of Historic Places.

It has been deemed "the most significant fishpond on Kauai, both in Hawaiian legends and folklore and in the eyes [of] Kauai's people today". It is the largest fishpond on Kaua`i, is estimated to have been constructed in the 15th century, and may be the first brackish-water fishpond in the Hawaiian Islands. Its construction is traditionally attributed to the Menehune, a mythical people said to have inhabited Hawai`i before the arrival of the Hawaiians. 

It was listed on the U.S. National Register in 1973; the listing included one contributing site and one contributing structure. In 2021 it was purchased by The Trust for Public Land and conveyed to Malama Hule‘ia, which has been restoring the land since 2018.

References 

Archaeological sites on the National Register of Historic Places in Hawaii
Farms on the National Register of Historic Places in Hawaii
Fishponds of Hawaii
Bodies of water of Kauai
History of Kauai
Protected areas of Kauai
Buildings and structures in Kauai County, Hawaii
Geography of Kauai County, Hawaii
National Register of Historic Places in Kauai County, Hawaii